The 2013 Buenos Aires rail disaster occurred on 13 June 2013 at about 07:30 local time (10:30 UTC), in Castelar, Buenos Aires Province, about 30km (19 miles) west of Buenos Aires, Argentina. 

A passenger train travelling in the morning rush hour hit a stationary train that was empty.  At least 3 people were killed and another 315 were injured. This crash took place on the Sarmiento line between Once railway station and Moreno, the same line which was the scene of the 2012 Buenos Aires rail disaster.

Following official investigations which determined that the brakes were in working order and that the driver sped through three warning signals without attempting to apply them, the driver, Daniel López, was formally charged with negligent homicide on October 2.

References

Railway accidents in 2013
2013 in Argentina
Train collisions in Argentina
Rail transport in Buenos Aires Province
Railway accidents involving a signal passed at danger
June 2013 events in South America
2013 disasters in Argentina